Alexandria Danielle DeBerry is an American actress and model. She is best known for her roles in A.N.T. Farm as Paisley Houndstooth, Shake It Up as Destiny, Lazer Team as Mindy and True Jackson, VP as Cammy.

Early life
 
DeBerry was born in the Kingwood neighborhood of Houston, Texas, the youngest of three children of Tom and Cindy DeBerry. She attended public school at Woodland Hills Elementary, Kingwood Middle School, and Kingwood Park High School. She is of English and Czech descent.

Acting career 
DeBerry's acting career officially began in 2001 where she played a flower girl in the TV film The Way She Moves. Also that year (2001) she guest starred as Brittany in It's a Miracle. In 2003, DeBerry landed a guest role in television series I'm with Her as young Alex. DeBerry had her first theatrical film in 2007 in Love and Mary as Sara Pedersen. The following year she continued her television career and booked the series What's the Word? which she was featured in two episodes. In 2009, DeBerry became more noticed for her guest role in the TV show True Jackson, VP, portraying the role of Cammy, a friend of Pinky played by Jennette McCurdy.

DeBerry was then featured on Disney Channel as she guest starred in Shake It Up; her role was Destiny (Flynn's crush) in the episode "Hook It Up". For 31 episodes, DeBerry appeared as Paisley Houndstooth on Disney Channel's comedy series A.N.T. Farm. DeBerry took on the female lead of Mindy in Rooster Teeth's first feature-length film Lazer Team.

DeBerry starred in Mamaboy as Lisa Weld, daughter of Reverend Weld (Stephen Tobolowsky).

Personal life
DeBerry married former Pittsburgh Pirates baseball player Tyler Beede in November 2017. In April 2022, DeBerry announced via her Instagram account that she was pregnant with her first child expected for October.

Filmography

Awards and nominations

References 
Footnotes

Citations

 Sierra McCormick & Allie DeBerry Dress Alike for 'A.N.T. Farm''' TV episode intelligANT'' by Just Jared Jr. Published September 2, 2012

External links 

21st-century American actresses
Actresses from Houston
Actresses from Texas
American child actresses
American child models
American film actresses
American television actresses
Living people
People from Kingwood, Texas
Year of birth missing (living people)